Mageiras is a mountain village in the municipal unit of Sympoliteia, Achaea, Greece. It is located in the eastern foothills of the Panachaiko, 2 km south of Arravonitsa, 8 km southwest of Rododafni and 10 km west of Aigio. In 2011, it had a population of 55.

Population

History

Mageiras was founded between 1750 and 1770 by residents of the large village Tsetsevos which suffered from landslides at the time. Landslides also hit Mageiras in the 1930s. Mageiras was part of the municipality of Erineos from 1845 until 1912, of the community of Myrovrysi until 1919 and of the community of Aragozena until 1924. Mageiras was an independent community until 1977, when it became a part of the newly formed municipality of Sympoliteia.

See also
List of settlements in Achaea

External links
Mageira at the GTP Travel Pages

References

Aigialeia
Populated places in Achaea